Brutal is a studio album by the Jamaican reggae band Black Uhuru. It was released in 1986 through Real Authentic Sound, making it their first album on the label. Audio production was handled by Doctor Dread, Arthur Baker, Steven Stanley and Black Uhuru. The album peaked at number 36 in New Zealand, number 73 in the Netherlands, and was nominated for Grammy Award for Best Reggae Recording at 29th Annual Grammy Awards. The album spawned five singles: "Conviction Or Fine", "Fit You Haffe Fit", "The Great Train Robbery", "Let Us Pray" and "Dread In The Mountain". The single "Great Train Robbery" also made it to charts, reaching #31 in New Zealand, #49 in the Netherlands, and #62 in the United Kingdom.

Track listing

Personnel 

 Delroy "Junior" Reid – lead vocals (tracks: 1-3, 5-8, 10)
 Sandra Jones – lead vocals (track 4), backing vocals
 Derrick Simpson – lead vocals (track 9), backing vocals
 Darryl A. Thompson – lead guitar
 Frank Stepanek – lead guitar
 Ira Siegel – lead guitar
 Wilbert "Willie" Lindo – rhythm guitar
 Robert Warren Dale Shakespeare – bass
 Robert Lyn – organ
 Tyrone Downie – organ & synthesizer
 Anthony Brissett – synthesizer
 Jeffrey S. Bova – synthesizer
 Leonard Brandon Pickett – horns
 Mark Gollehom – horns
 Lowell Fillmore Dunbar – drums
 Bashiri Johnson – percussion
 Christopher "Sky Juice" Burth – percussion
 Gary Himelfarb – producer (tracks: 1, 3-10)
 Steven J. C. Stanley – producer (track 2), engineering (tracks: 2, 6)
 Arthur Henry Baker – producer (track 3), engineering (tracks: 1, 3)
 Jim Fox – engineering (tracks: 4, 5, 7-10)
 Conrad Malcolm – engineering (tracks: 2, 6)
 Dave O'grin – assistant engineering (tracks: 1, 3)
 Kelly Lee – artwork
 Tommy Noonan – photography

Charts

References

External links 

1986 albums
Black Uhuru albums
Albums produced by Arthur Baker (musician)